Anthony Caldwell (born 21 March 1958) is an English former professional footballer who played in the Football League as a forward.

References

1958 births
Living people
Footballers from Salford
English footballers
Association football forwards
Leigh Genesis F.C. players
Bolton Wanderers F.C. players
Bristol City F.C. players
Chester City F.C. players
Grimsby Town F.C. players
Stockport County F.C. players
Chorley F.C. players
Salford City F.C. players
Hyde United F.C. players
English Football League players
National League (English football) players